Persona: Trinity Soul is an anime television series produced by Aniplex and animated by A-1 Pictures. It began airing on Tokyo MX on January 5, 2008, and ran for twenty-six episodes, concluding on June 28, 2008. The series also aired on BS11, MBS, Animax, CTC, CBC, TV Saitama and tvk.

The show takes place approximately 10 years after the events of Persona 3. A string of mysterious paranormal attacks on civilians in Ayanagi City brings the Kanzato siblings together as they try to figure out who or what is responsible for the attacks. Jun and Shin team up with friends to figure out how the attacks affect their lives with the help of mysterious entities called Personas.

The show featured four theme songs. For the first thirteen episodes, the opening song was "Breakin' Through" by Shūhei Kita and the ending song was "Suicides Love Story" by Nana Kitade. The last thirteen episodes used "Word of the Voice" by Flow as the opening theme and "Found Me" by Yumi Kawamura as the ending theme. Three of these songs were released as singles in 2008: "Breakin' Through" on February 27, "Suicides Love Story" on March 5, and "Word of the Voice" on June 4. "Found Me" can only be found on the soundtrack CD, which was released on July 2, 2008.

In Japan, the entire series was released in 10 volumes. Volume 1 was released April 23, 2008. Volume 2 was released May 28, 2008. Volume 3 was released June 25, 2008. Volume 4 was released July 23, 2008. Volume 5 was released August 27, 2008. Volume 6 was released September 24, 2008. Volume 7 was released October 22, 2008. Volume 8 was released November 26, 2008. Volume 9 was released December 17, 2008. Volume 10 was released January 28, 2009.


Episodes

References
General
 
 

Specific

External links
 Official website 
 Tokyo MX's Official website 

Persona (series)
Persona: Trinity Soul